S95 may refer to:
 Canon PowerShot S95, a digital camera
 Martin Field (Washington), in Walla Walla County, Washington, United States